Eriocephalus racemosus is a species of flowering plant in the genus Eriocephalus. It is endemic to the Cape Provinces of South Africa. It is also called the kapokbos (Afrikaans for snow bush).

Distribution 
Eriocephalus racemosus is found in sandy soil along the coast, extending from Hondeklip Bay to Melklbosstrand, and from Port Elizabeth to Lambert's Bay.

Subspecies 
There are 2 infraspecific named varieties of the species racemosus:

 Eriocephalus racemosus var. racemosus
 Eriocephalus racemosus var. affinis (DC.) Harv.

Conservation status 
Eriocephalus racemosus is classified as Least Concern as it is quite common in its natural habitat.

Uses 
This species, Eriocephalus racemosus, along with Eriocephalus ericoides, have been used at the Cape for their diaphoretic and diuretic effects.

References

External links 
 
 

Endemic flora of South Africa
Flora of South Africa
Flora of the Cape Provinces
racemosus